The House of Scientists in St Petersburg was the first House of Scientists established in Russia. It was  initiated by the Petrograd Commission for the Improvement of the Life of Scientists (PetroKUBU) on January 31, 1920. It was established in the Vladimir Palace, former residence of Grand Duke Vladimir Alexandrovich of Russia. It is located on the Palace Embankment, a street that runs along the bank of Neva River in Central Saint Petersburg.

References

Houses of Scientists
Scientific organizations based in Russia
Scientific organizations established in 1920
Scientific societies based in Russia